Riada Wal Adab Club  is a football club based in Tripoli, Lebanon, that competes in the . Nicknamed "Ambassador of the North", Riada Wal Adab was founded in 1930.

Riada Wal Adab first participated in the Lebanese Premier League during the 1969–70 season. They finished as runners-up in 1987–88. Their last participation in the Lebanese top division dates back to the 1997–98 season, with the club playing between the Lebanese Second Division and Lebanese Third Division ever since.

History 
Founded in 1902, the club received their official licence in 1930;<ref name=":0">{{Cite web|script-title=ar:نــادٍ من لبنان :  الرياضة والأدب - طرابلس (1) - الحلقة الأولى !!|url=https://forum.kooora.com/?t=6094913|access-date=2020-05-22|website=forum.kooora.com}}</ref> they are Tripoli's first football club. Izzat Al-Turk was a representative of the club at the Lebanese Football Association's founding meeting in 1933. Nazem Sayadi, the club's goalkeeper during the 1939–40 season, was Lebanon's goalkeeper during their first international match against Mandatory Palestine in 1940.

Riada Wal Adab first participated in the Lebanese Premier League during the 1969–70 season, finishing eighth out of 12. The Tripoli-based club participated in the 1987 Arab Club Champions Cup as the competition's Lebanese Premier League representative. In 1987–88, Riada Wal Adab finished as runners-up in the league.

Riada Wal Adab's last participation in the Lebanese top flight dates back to the 1997–98 season, where they came last and were relegated to the Lebanese Second Division. The club has played between the Second and Third Division ever since.

 Honours 
 Lebanese Second Division
Winners (1): 1994–95
 Lebanese Third Division
Winners (2): 1964–65, 2007–08
 Lebanese Premier LeagueRunners-up (1):'' 1987–88

See also 
 List of football clubs in Lebanon

References 

 
Football clubs in Lebanon
Association football clubs established in 1930
1930 establishments in Lebanon